Jeffery Allen Martin (born January 14, 1967) is a retired American professional basketball player.

Martin, a 6'5" shooting guard from Murray State University, was selected in the second round, 31st overall in the 1989 NBA Draft, by the Los Angeles Clippers.

College career

In 1988, Martin became the first basketball player in Murray State, and Ohio Valley Conference, history to be invited to the Olympic trials for the US Basketball Team.  This was the last year that professionals were not allowed on the team.  Martin did not make the team but impressed many with his performance.  In 1989, he was named an All-American and had his number (15) retired.  He is still the all-time scoring leader in the Murray State men's basketball program history with 2,484 points

Professional career

Martin played in the NBA from 1989 to 1991, with career averages of 7 points and 2 rebounds in 143 regular season contests.  Having played during preseason with the Detroit Pistons, Martin was waived before 1991-92 began, subsequently moving to Europe, where he appeared for Scaini Venezia (1991–92), Natwest Zaragoza (1992–93), Baloncesto Salamanca (1995–96), Baloncesto Fuenlabrada and Besançon Basket (1996–97), CB Ciudad de Huelva (1997–98) and Montpellier Basket (2000–01). These were punctuated by brief returns to the U.S., in both the Continental Basketball Association (CBA), always with the Grand Rapids Hoops, and the International Basketball League (IBL). Martin was a three-time selection to the All-CBA Second Team in 1992, 1994 and 1999.

References

External links
College & NBA stats @ basketballreference.com
Basketpedya career data

1967 births
Living people
African-American basketball players
American expatriate basketball people in France
American expatriate basketball people in Italy
American expatriate basketball people in Spain
American men's basketball players
Baloncesto Fuenlabrada players
Basket CRO Lyon players
Basketball players from Arkansas
Besançon BCD players
CB Zaragoza players
Grand Rapids Hoops players
Las Vegas Silver Bandits players
Liga ACB players
Los Angeles Clippers draft picks
Los Angeles Clippers players
Montpellier Paillade Basket players
Murray State Racers men's basketball players
People from Cherry Valley, Arkansas
Reyer Venezia players
Shooting guards
SIG Basket players
21st-century African-American people
20th-century African-American sportspeople